Evidence is a 2012 American found footage horror film directed and edited by Howie Askins and produced and written by Ryan McCoy, who also stars in the movie. The film also stars Brett Rosenberg, Abigail Richie, and Ashley Bracken.

Synopsis

Ryan is making a documentary on his friend, Brett, about camping for the first time. However, once they begin camping, they discover that there is a mysterious figure that is hunting them.

Cast
 Ryan McCoy as Ryan
 Brett Rosenberg as Brett
 Abigail Richie as Abi
 Ashley Bracken as Ashley
 Zack Fahey as Man in Gown 
 Blaine Gray as Rogue Wolf
 Keith Lewis as Lone Wolf
 Risdon Roberts as Sara
 Andrew Varenhorst as Stairway man

Development
Askins began developing Evidence in January 2010 after viewing Paranormal Activity and began shooting the film in April of the same year. The film was shot in chronological order and the production cost $12,000 to make in its entirety.

Reception
Critical reception for Evidence has been mixed to negative, with Bloody Disgusting saying it "[failed] to scare". Shock Till You Drop panned the film overall, calling it a "good effort" but criticized the film's shift in tone. In contrast, Dread Central gave a more positive review, giving it 3 1/2 out of 5 blades and praising the film's shift. JoBlo's Arrow in the Head reviewer Matt Withers wrote that he "kinda dug it" but that "a couple of effective scares and some solid visuals aren't enough to make up for a story that makes little attempt to explain itself and drags far too often to be considered truly successful".

Sequel
According to Ryan McCoy on a couple of interviews, a sequel is currently in the works. It is said to be both a prequel and a sequel.

References

External links

2012 horror films
American horror films
Found footage films
2012 films
2010s English-language films
2010s American films